Stefan Petrov (born 19 May 1936) is a Bulgarian wrestler. He competed in the men's Greco-Roman +97 kg at the 1968 Summer Olympics.

References

1936 births
Living people
Bulgarian male sport wrestlers
Olympic wrestlers of Bulgaria
Wrestlers at the 1968 Summer Olympics
Sportspeople from Stara Zagora